Titans is an American prime time television soap opera created by Charles Pratt Jr. that aired on NBC October 4 to December 18, 2000. Thirteen episodes were filmed, of which eleven were actually aired. Produced by Aaron Spelling, the series was initially marketed as a "Dynasty for the new millennium," attempting to emulate the style of Spelling's earlier hit series. However, low ratings led NBC to cancel the series before its first season was completed.

Synopsis
Aviation magnate Richard Williams (Perry King) is engaged to the much younger Heather (Yasmine Bleeth). He is unaware that she previously had an affair with his son, Chandler (Casper Van Dien), who is a pilot. Chandler is unsure whether he should reveal this to his father. Chandler discovers that Heather is pregnant with his child. Meanwhile, Heather clashes with Richard's former wife, Gwen (Victoria Principal), who lives in a mansion across the street. After Richard and Heather marry, Chandler's scheming brother Peter (John Barrowman) finds out about her affair with Chandler.

Cast

Main
 Yasmine Bleeth as Heather Lane-Williams, Richard's second wife and Chandler's lover
 Casper Van Dien as Chandler Williams, the golden boy of the Williams family, and a former pilot in the Navy; Heather's lover
 Perry King as Richard Williams (episodes 1-5), patriarch of the Williams family, a dashing man who runs Williams Global Enterprises with an iron fist
 Victoria Principal as Gwendolyn "Gwen" Williams, Richard's ex-wife and mother of his four children. She owns a nightclub, Pulse, and a chain of hotels. She lives opposite Richard and detests his new fiancée, Heather
 John Barrowman as Peter Williams, Richard and Gwen's other son
 Elizabeth Bogush as Jennifer "Jenny" Williams, Richard and Gwen's daughter
 Josie Davis as Lauren "Laurie" Williams, Richard and Gwen's daughter
 Lourdes Benedicto as Samantha Sanchez, Richard's executive assistant and the daughter of the family's former maid
 Jason George as Scott Littleton
 Jack Wagner as Jack Williams, Richard's brother (episodes 2, 6–13)
 Ingo Rademacher as David O'Connor (episodes 2–13)
 Kevin Zegers as Ethan Benchley (episodes 3–13)

Recurring
 Katie Stuart as Faith
 Michelle Holgate as Eve

Production
The casting of Van Dien and King was announced in February 2000. Additional cast members included soap opera veterans Bleeth, Principal, David, and Wagner.

Titans premiered on October 4, 2000, and four additional episodes were ordered in November 2000.

Episodes

Notes

Broadcast
Titans premiered on Wednesday, October 4, 2000, before the season two premiere of The West Wing. Titans attracted 11.6 million viewers and delivered key demographics for NBC, but ratings for the second and third episodes declined significantly. They climbed again for subsequent episodes, to a high of 8.5 for the sixth episode. Around this time, four additional episodes were ordered. The show averaged 8 million viewers over its initial eight weeks, ranking 83rd overall.

Titans was moved to Mondays starting with its ninth episode on December 4, 2000, taking over the timeslot previously held by cancelled sitcoms Daddio and Tucker. Ed, a dramedy which had premiered the same week as Titans and was also suffering from declining ratings, moved into the vacant Wednesday slot. While Ed saw ratings improvement, Titans attracted only 6.6 million viewers for its Monday debut, and was effectively canceled the next day with the announcement that NBC would not be ordering additional episodes. Though the remaining four produced episodes were expected to be aired, only two were broadcast in the United States, the last on December 18, 2000.

Reception
John Kiesewetter of The Cincinnati Enquirer called the series "a mindless soap about filthy-rich, amoral people" but added, "As much as I wanted to hate Titans, I couldn't stop watching. Perhaps Mr. Spelling and Mr. Vincent have reinvented Dynasty, creating a Young and the Shirtless for the new millennium." David Zurawik of The Baltimore Sun called the acting "stunningly bad", citing Principal as "the one saving grace on the show". Phil Gallo of Variety singled out Bleeth as "eminently watchable". Despite the show's low ratings, Entertainment Weekly Kristen Baldwin called its cancellation "a mistake", suggesting that viewership would have grown over time. Media ad buying executive Bob Flood admitted to Variety after the show's cancellation, "We thought Titans would be better than it turned out to be."

References

External links
 

NBC original programming
2000s American drama television series
2000 American television series debuts
2000 American television series endings
Television series about dysfunctional families
American television soap operas
American primetime television soap operas
Television series by CBS Studios
Television series by Spelling Television
English-language television shows